Voronkin, Voronkina is a surname. Notable people with the surname include:

Artyom Voronkin (born 1986), Russian footballer
Yuriy Voronkin (born 1979), Russian hammer thrower
Elena Voronkina (born 1973), Ukrainian volleyball player

Russian-language surnames